Loving Every Minute may refer to:

"Loving Every Minute" (Lighthouse Family song), 1996
Loving Every Minute (album), an album by Mark Wills
 "Loving Every Minute" (Mark Wills song), its title track
Lovin' Every Minute, an album by Baillie & the Boys

See also
Lovin' Every Minute of It, a 1985 album by Loverboy
"Lovin' Every Minute of It" (song), the title track